Jeong Hyun-woo (born 12 July 2000) is a South Korea footballer currently playing as a midfielder.

Career statistics

Club

References

2000 births
Living people
South Korean footballers
Association football midfielders
K League 2 players
K League 1 players
Gwangju FC players